The Manchester Premier Cup (also known as the Frank Hannah Manchester Premier Cup) is an annual English football knockout tournament involving teams from Greater Manchester, England. It is a County Cup competition of the Manchester Football Association and involves Non-league football clubs, although at least one Football League club has entered the competition.

Ashton United F.C.  are the current holders.

History
The Manchester Premier Cup, originally known as the Manchester County FA Shield, was first competed for in the 1934–35 season, when Manchester North End beat Hurst 5–2, in the final to become the inaugural champions at their Charles Street Ground in Blackley in front of a crowd of 2,400. The gate receipts of £59 were distributed 50% to the FA and 25% to each of the finalists. For the 1955–56 season the name was changed to the Manchester Intermediate Cup and was again changed for the 1979–80 season to the present name.

The competition has been dominated by the teams in the Tameside borough of Manchester who have won the contest 55 times. Central Manchester teams have won it six times, teams from Bury winning four times and Salford and Wigan twice. A team from outside the Greater Manchester borders has only ever won the trophy once.

Finals

Key

Results

Source (1934–2010 Finals):

Results by team
Teams shown in italics are no longer in existence.

See also
List of football clubs in Greater Manchester
Liverpool Senior Cup
Lancashire Senior Cup
Lancashire Challenge Trophy

Footnotes

References 

Football in Greater Manchester